The Qatar national beach handball team is the national team of Qatar. It is governed by the Qatar Handball Association and takes part in international beach handball competitions.

World Championships results

Asian Championship results

References

External links
IHF profile

Beach handball
National beach handball teams
Beach handball